Tammy Brook is an American businesswoman, founder and CEO of FYI Brand Group.

Personal life 
Tammy Brook grew up in Brentwood, California. Her father is Itzhak Brook, and her brother is a filmmaker named Yoni Brook.

Career 
Brook started her career as a music executive at Empire Management. She founded FYI Brand Communications in 2001 as a PR and brand marketing agency. FYI Brand Group has represented Apple Music, Adidas, MTV, Jhené Aiko, DJ Khaled, Travis Scott, French Montana, Pusha T, Steve Aoki, Russell Westbrook, and Odell Beckham Jr..

Brook was named to Variety's Power of Women Impact List in 2018.

In 2019, when 21 Savage was detained by ICE, Brook created the #Free21Savage human rights coalition, winning the Social Good Creator Award at The 9th Annual Streamy Awards for 21 Savage's literacy campaign.

References 

Living people
American women chief executives
21st-century American businesspeople
People from Brentwood, California
Year of birth missing (living people)
21st-century American businesswomen